Arbovirus is a Bangladeshi rock band formed in 2001 in Dhaka.
They have released three Studio Albums, one EP, and twelve singles through various mixed albums.

History

Formation and early years (2001-2005) 

Suharto formed the band with Ranjan in 2001. The line up consisted of Suharto and Ranjan on guitars, Shobhon on vocal, Himel on drums. Bassist Salek from Reborn played as a guest member. 
Around mid-2003, Ishtiaq Jishan, and Farhan Tanim joined as a bassist, and drummer respectively.
In the same year Sufi joined as a vocal to complete the line up.

Band's early releases includes singles like "আর্তনাদ (ARTONAD)" in the mixed album "আগন্তুক-২ (AGONTUK-2)", which earned them their first record deal with the label G-Series.

64m 53s (2006) 

Band released their debut album 64m 53s on July 20, 2006, under the banner of G-Series.

On 26 January 2006, Arbovirus performed their first international show at the Salt Lake Stadium on the eve of Indian Republic Day along with Warfaze, Artcell, Metal Maze, Lakkhichhara, Cactus (Indian band), Insomnia (band), and Fossils.

Struggle with the line up (2008-2011) 

In 2008 Jishan moved abroad to pursue higher education. Tanim followed the same path in 2009. Aldnane Alam joined shortly after Jishan left. Shuvo (Ex Aurthohin) joined as a drummer, but he also left the band as he would permanently move to Australia.

In 2012 drummer Nafeez Al Amin joined the band.

Montobbo Nishproyojon (2012-2013) 

In 2012 - partnering with Livesquare, and Apex Footwear Sprint as a sponsor - band signed a deal for the second album.

In December 2012 the band performed in the "Urban Youth Festival".

They made two collaborative tracks with Beatbaksho, rapper Amewu and one of the Voice of the Germany producer DJ Werd. They also performed the entire set on the Ekushey TV, including their title track "Raise Your Voice", and "Grime Time".

Arbovirus released their second album Montobbo Nishproyojon on 5 July 2013 at the Russian Cultural Center.
The album consists of eight tracks.
In order to bridge the seven years gap with their audience the band decided to give it away as a free digital download, and never released any physical version of it until the release of Bishesh Droshtobbo.

Bishesh Droshtobbo (2017)

Their third album, Bishesh Droshtobbo, was initially planned as a B-side album of the second album with the left over tracks from their second album. But later on the band decided to add more songs to it and release it as a full-length album which now consists of nine tracks.

Band organized their first ever solo concert since their foundation to commemorate 15 years of the band and the launching of their third album. The concert was held on 13 January 2017 in Russian Cultural Center. The album was released on their YouTube channel, and double CD of both Montobyo Nishproyojon and Bishesh Droshtobbo was made available through pre-order home-delivery. 
Since the band did not sign up with any record label, they took over the CD production and packaging among the teammates. All the packaging were personally done by the band members and associated teammates.

Lyrics

All of the lyrics are written in Bangla, and written by Ranjan, except for 'Artonad' by Shobhon, 'Ja Ichhe Tai', and 'Shottohatha' by Sufi and 'Shopnadishto' by Rumman.

Associated acts
Guitarist Ranjan has been contributing to different bands as a lyricist for quite a long time, even long before he formed the band. He has contributed lyrics to many prominent musicians including Miles, Artcell, and Aurthohin.
Besides – he has an experimental project named Purple Haze, and Lare Lappa.

On 15 January 2015, Sufi along with Polash from Warfaze, Shakib from Cryptic Fate, Jamshed from Powersurge performed at the curtain closing show of Rockstrata, one of the pioneering Heavy Metal bands of Bangladesh.

Bassist Aldnane also have been playing and writing lyrics for the experimental rock band Kral. He is also a part of the Progressive Instrumental super group Air and Air who has released their first studio album in 2014.

Drummer Nafeez has been a regular session player; among them are Dethrow, Breach, Kronic, Elita Karim and Friends, and Jazzy Chopsticks.
In 2019 Nafeez got the endorsement from Soultone Cymbals.

Songwriter/Producer/Guitarist of the band, Suharto Sherif plays and writes for ARBOVIRUS only.

Discography

Studio albums
 64m 53s (20 July 2006)
 Montobbo Nishproyojon (5 July 2013)
 Bishesh Droshtobbo (13 January 2017)
 Bishesh Droshtobbo : Shorashori Shomprochar (13 January 2017)

Extended play
 Otopor (14 April 2019)

Singles (in various mixed albums)
 Aartonad in Agantuk 2 (2003)
 Obhishap in Din Bodol (2004)
 Shopnadishto in Lokayot (2004)
 Shohor in Boka Manushta {ft. Sumon 'BassBaba' of Aurthohin} (2007)
 Shurjo Shontan in Live Now (2007)
 Prayoshchitto in Bonno {ft. Fuad Almuqtadir} (2007)
 Addhek Kotha in Rock 101 (2008)
 Keu Karo Noy in Rock 202 (2009)
 Prarthona in Rock 505 (2010)
 Bangladesh Gori in Gorje Uttho Bangladesh (2011)
 Agontuk in Rock 606 (2011)
 Goal in Rock 808 (2015)

Band members

Current members
 Suharto Sherif – Guitars, backing vocals (2001–present)
 Asif Asgar Ranjan – Lyrics, Guitars (2001–present)
 Aldnane Alam - Bass (2009–present)
 Nafeez Al Amin – Drums (2012–present)
 Zakir Hossain - Sound Engineer (2013-present) 
 Montasir Mamun Shopno - Guitars (2021-present)
 Sayemul Islam Riyad - Drums (2021-present) 
 Shams Alim Biswas - Bass (2021-present).
 Priodip Deb Nath - Drums (in imagine)
 Shahan Kamal (Uday) - Vocal (2022- Present)

Former members
 Ishtiaq Ahmed Shovon – Vocals (2001–2003)
 Ahsanur Rahman Himel – Drums (2001–2003)
 Ishtiaq Hossain Jishan – Bass (2003–2008)
 Farhan Tanim – Drums (2003–2009)
 Muntasir Mamun Shuvo – Drums (2010–2011)
 Mong Sai Marma - Bass (2016-2021) 
 Fasihuddin Ahmed - Guitars (2016- 2020)
 Sufi Maverick – Vocals (2003–2022)

Timeline

References

External links
 

Bangladeshi heavy metal musical groups
Musical groups established in 2002
Nu metal musical groups